Gunnar Johansson may refer to:

 Gunnar Johansson (composer) (1906–1991),  Swedish composer
Gunnar Johansson (immunologist) (born 1938), Swedish immunologist
Gunnar Johansson (canoeist) (1919–1998), Swedish sprint canoeist
Gunnar Johansson (diver) (1924–1997), Swedish Olympic diver
Gunnar Johansson (footballer) (1924–2003), Swedish footballer
Gunnar Johansson (psychophysicist) (1911–1998), Swedish psychophysicist
Gunnar Johansson (water polo) (born 1957), Swedish Olympic water polo player

See also
Gunnar Johansen (1906–1991), pianist and composer